The northern deep-brown dart (Aporophyla lueneburgensis) is a moth of the family Noctuidae. It was first described by Christian Friedrich Freyer in 1848 and it is found in northern and western Europe. 

As the common name suggests, this species usually has very dark brown to purplish grey forewings, although paler grey forms exist. There is always a much darker central band, almost black in the darker forms. All the lines and stigmata are very neatly marked and edged with paler. By contrast, the hindwings are much paler, often almost pure white in the male but usually with darker venation. The wingspan is 36–41 mm. It is a decidedly smaller and neater insect than Aporophyla lutulenta. It flies at night in August and September and is attracted to light and sugar as well as various flowers.

The larva usually feeds on heather but has been recorded on other low plants such as bird's-foot trefoil. This species overwinters as a small larva.

Taxonomy
Aporophyla lueneburgensis may be a subspecies of Aporophyla lutulenta.

The flight season refers to the British Isles. This may vary in other parts of the range.

References 

Chinery, Michael (1986, reprinted 1991). Collins Guide to the Insects of Britain and Western Europe.
Skinner, Bernard (1984). The Colour Identification Guide to Moths of the British Isles.

External links

 Taxonomy
Fauna Europaea
Lepiforum e.V.

Aporophyla
Moths described in 1848
Moths of Europe
Taxa named by Christian Friedrich Freyer